

BBN Filecomp 

FILECOMP was a programming language developed at Bolt, Beranek and Newman (BBN).  It was one of the three variants of JOSS II (along with TELCOMP and STRINGCOMP) that were developed by BBN. 

The language was developed by Jordan Baruch specifically for the GE MEDINET project (Ed Yourdon's first "Death March” project).  It added implicit file handling capabilities and was influential on MUMPS.

RCA FileComp
Filecomp or FileComp was a type composition language that ran on the RCA 1600 computer attached to the RCA Graphic Services Division (GSD) VideoComp CRT typesetter. 

The VideoComp was developed by Dr. Rudolf Hell of Kiel, Germany, as the Digiset, and marketed by RCA GSD in the U.S. in the late 1960s and early 1970s as the VideoComp. When RCA got out of the computer business, support of the VideoComp was taken over by Information International, Inc. or Triple I.

Filecomp resembled an odd mix of Fortran, Cobol, Assembly and RCA GSD Page-1 Composition Languages. The user would write a program in Filecomp to read a computer data base or text file and compose it for typeset output.

JOSS programming language family